The Navigo card, formerly called the Navigo pass, is a means of payment for public transportation introduced on 1 October 2001 in the City of Paris and Île-de-France region. It is implemented as a contactless smart card using the Calypso standard, initially with Radio-frequency identification (RFID), then Near-field communication (NFC) since 9 December 2013, and enables authenticated access at turnstiles by scanning the card at an electronic reader. Since July 2018, the payment, loading of season or single tickets and their validation at turnstiles is directly possible with a smartphone.

System
Cards are available either attached to an account for those who live or work in the Île-de-France region (known simply as Carte Navigo), or can be issued on the spot to anyone at a station (Carte Navigo Découverte). The Navigo card bears the name and a photograph of the holder. While the account-based cards are free, a Découverte card, mainly dedicated to tourists, costs €5 at ticket booths. Cards can be credited and season tickets reloaded at ticket booths and machines. Since 2009 on internet for daily, weekly or monthly use; Carte Navigo users can also buy a yearly pass, payable in one or eleven monthly payments.  

Pass holders wishing to travel outside the chosen zones of validity may purchase an extension ticket which is loaded onto the card for immediate use; this is unnecessary on weekends and public holidays for those with a monthly or annual pass, which are valid throughout all zones irrespective of zones actually purchased. 

Single-trip and 10-trip (discounted) tickets, daily tickets and Roissybus and Orlybus tickets can be loaded together onto the Carte Navigo Easy and are accepted in all stations and buses or the two airport buses. Busier Métro and RER stations will usually have several turnstiles set aside for Navigo card holders exclusively. Their equivalent paper tickets were available from station agents and ticket vending machines until 2021. Bus drivers also sell single-trip tickets. The 1 to 5 days Paris Visite paper tickets which offer discounts for tourist attractions cannot yet be loaded on this card. Unlike comparable cards issued in other major cities (Amsterdam, Lisbon), there is no facility to add a certain amount of credit in euros on the card, reduced at each trip, for use on irregular journeys over a period of time, but only single-trip or season tickets. The Carte Navigo Liberté+ service allows connections between all means of transport (except the RER outside Paris) for the same single-trip ticket during the 1 hour 30 minute trip, with a daily limit of €7,5 (slightly lower than the cost of the Day pass); subscribers are billed monthly on all trips made. The service is available to residents of Île-de-France region.

Single-trip and 10-trip (discounted) tickets, daily tickets, Roissybus and Orlybus airports tickets and season tickets of weekly or monthly Navigo cards can also be loaded with the application Vianavigo (not yet accepted by Apple) on a Samsung Galaxy smartphone or any Android 6.0 (or up) NFC smartphone using the operators Orange or Sosh. The mobile phone itself is then used like a contactless card to validate on the turnstile readers.

Navigo cards can be used on the vehicles of the RATP, the SNCF (within the Transilien network), Optile bus companies, and other companies under the aegis of Île-de-France Mobilités (IDFM). The cards are also accepted on the Vélib' bicycle rental system. From 2011, the card could also be used with the Autolib electric car-sharing service, until they ceased operations in 2018 and were replaced by Mobilib'.

History

When the system was introduced in 2001, it was only available to subscribers of the Carte Intégrale annual pass.  In 2003, it was increased to users of the Carte Imagine'R student pass. From end 2004, the Navigo card was available for travel within zones one and two of the Paris transportation region for Carte orange weekly and monthly passes, then in all bus and tramways from January 2005 to January 2006. Since 20 May 2006, it has been possible to use the card in all means of transport and in the entirety of the Île-de-France region in place of the magnetic paper tickets of the conventional Carte orange, which was completely discontinued in February 2009.

In July 2007, the Navigo card became compatible with Vélib', the bicycle-sharing system of the City of Paris.  

On 1 September 2007, the Carte Navigo Découverte replaced the former equivalent version of the Carte Orange issued on the spot to anyone at a station without registration and in particular to the tourists not residing in the Île-de-France region. 

On 9 December 2013, the Navigo card was redesigned by Philippe Starck and used NFC technology instead of RFID. 

Since 1 January 2018, the daily ticket formerly called Mobilis can be loaded on the Navigo card. 

The Carte Navigo Easy was introduced on 12 June 2019 to replace the majority of the magnetic paper single-trip "t+" tickets (but not yet the 1 to 5 days Paris Visite tickets) by loading them the same Navigo card. On 13 November 2019, the Carte Navigo Liberté+ subscription was introduced, which allows single-trip transfers between RER zone 1, metro, tramway and bus during the 90 minute trip. Subscribers are billed monthly on all trips made, with a daily cost cap that equals a daily ticket.

After a test of the new application by members of staff and  users since July 2018, with the operator Orange then with Samsung Galaxy phones, on 25 September 2019, the payment and loading of the Navigo card season tickets and some single tickets was made possible to all on smartphones and their validation at turnstiles became directly possible with the smartphone.

References

External links

  Official Navigo website
  Passe Navigo Découverte and Carte Orange Hebdomadaire
  Page du site de la RATP sur Navigo

Fare collection systems in France
Transport in Île-de-France
Contactless smart cards